Dragoș Nicolae Dima (born 30 July 1979 in Focșani) is a Romanian former rugby union prop and current coach.

Dima spent his entire club career in France, playing for Castres Olympique (1999/02), Stade Toulousain (2002/05), Villefranchois (2005/06), Section Paloise (2006/08), US Orthez (2008/09), Oloron (2009/10) and Blagnac (2010/11). He was the assistant coach of Angers in the 2013/14 season

He has 39 caps for Romania, from 1999 to 2011, scoring 2 tries, 10 points on aggregate. He had his debut for the "Oaks" at the 1999 Rugby World Cup, playing in three games as a substitute but without scoring. He would be called again for the 2011 Rugby World Cup, but this time he didn't play.

Dima comes from a sporting family. His mother Constanța was a volleyball player and his father Costică a former Greco-Roman wrestler.

Honours

Club
Toulouse
 Heineken Cup: 2004–05

Castres
European Challenge Cup runner-up: 1999–00

International
Romania
European Nations Cup: 2000

References

External links

1979 births
Sportspeople from Focșani
Living people
Romanian rugby union players
Rugby union props
Castres Olympique players
Stade Toulousain players
Section Paloise players
Romania international rugby union players
Romanian expatriate rugby union players
Romanian expatriate sportspeople in France
Expatriate rugby union players in France